Many British nationals from the United Kingdom or colonies who were resident in Canada during the First World War joined the Canadian Expeditionary Force, which was deployed to the Western Front. A sizeable percentage of Bermuda's volunteers who served in the war joined the CEF or the Royal Canadian Navy (RCN), either because they were resident in Canada already, or because Canada was the easiest other part of the British Empire and Commonwealth to reach from Bermuda (1,239 kilometres (770 miles) from Nova Scotia). As the Royal Canadian Regiment, 38th Battalion (Ottawa), CEF, 77th Battalion, CEF, and 163rd Battalion (French-Canadian), CEF, were successively posted to the Bermuda Garrison before proceeding to France, islanders were also able to enlist there. Although the Bermuda Militia Artillery (BMA) and Bermuda Volunteer Rifle Corps (BVRC) both sent contingents to the Western Front, the first would not arrive there until June 1915. By then, many Bermudians had already been serving on the Western Front in the CEF for months. No further contingents were sent to France by the BVRC after 1916, however forty-seven BVRC NCOs and Riflemen (Privates) were permitted to re-enlist in Canada during the course of the war. Although some enlisted in British Army organs in Canada, including the Royal Flying Corps, most joined the Canadian Expeditionary Force. Bermudians in the CEF enlisted under the same terms as Canadians.

Bermudians had long played important roles in the government and development of the continental colonies of British North America and the Dominion of Canada. Bermudian merchant John Dunscombe (1777 – November 1847) was a member of the Executive Council for Newfoundland from 1833 to 1842. John Hamilton Gray (1814-1889) was a politician in the Province of New Brunswick, a jurist, and one of the Fathers of the Confederation of Canada. He was also a Lieutenant-Colonel, and the Commanding Officer of the Queen’s Rangers of New Brunswick. Bermudians consequently contributed to the Canadian war effort in other ways than serving abroad themselves, including by sending their Canadian and Newfoundland-born children into the ranks of the CEF. Although a civilian, Bermudian-born Sir Joseph Outerbridge was the commanding officer of the Church Lads' Brigade from 1890 to 1894, and during the First World War was the vice president of the Patriotic Association of Newfoundland (which was not then a part of Canada), which raised and maintained the Newfoundland Regiment (organised as part of the British Army, rather than the Canadian Militia). The regiment had been formed following a meeting at the Colonial Office on 10 August 1914, where representatives of the Church Lads Brigade, the Methodist Guards, the Catholic Cadet Corps, the Newfoundland Highlanders, the Legion of Frontiersmen and St. John's Rifle Club agreed to form a unit of 500 all ranks, administered by a Reserve Force Committee chaired by Sir Joseph Outerbridge. Enlistment began at the Church Lads' Brigade Armoury on the 21st August, 1914. Outerbridge's sons included United States-born Lieutenant-Colonel Sir Leonard Cecil Outerbridge, MBE, DSO, who had been commissioned into the 10th Regiment, Royal Grenadiers, in 1912, and joined the CEF in 1915. He served with the 35th and 75th Battalions, and on the staffs of the first Canadian Infantry Brigade and the Fourth Canadian Division. He was twice mentioned-in-despatches and was awarded the Distinguished Service Order. He became the Honorary Colonel of the Newfoundland Regiment in 1949, and was the Lieutenant-Governor of Newfoundland from 1949 to 1957. Lieutenant Norman Aubrey Outerbridge of the 1st Battalion, The Newfoundland Regiment, was killed at Monchy-le-Preux on 14 April 1917. Another son, Captain Herbert A. Outerbridge, MBE, also served on the Western Front in the 1st Battalion, Newfoundland Regiment.

The following list, which is undoubtedly incomplete, only includes those who joined Canadian military units during the war, not those who served in the RCN, or those who joined British Army units, such as the Royal Flying Corps, in Canada without passing through nominally Canadian military units first.

References

Bermuda in World War I
Canadian Expeditionary Force soldiers